{{DISPLAYTITLE:C24H29ClO4}}
The molecular formula C24H29ClO4 may refer to:

 Chlormethenmadinone acetate, a progestin medication developed in Czechoslovakia in the 1960s
 Cyproterone acetate, among others, is an antiandrogen and progestin medication